Rajakota Rahasyam is a 1971 Indian Telugu-language swashbuckler film directed by B. Vittalacharya. It stars N. T. Rama Rao and Devika with music composed by Vijaya Krishna Murthy. The film was produced by M. K. Gangaraju under the G. R. Productions banner.

Plot
The film begins with, King Ananda Bhupathi (Mikkilineni) loving and secretly marrying a sage Govardhan Marharshi's (Mukkamala) daughter Yasodhara. Later on, he forgets her, Yashodhara gives birth to a baby boy and knowing it, her father curses become a stone. King Dhanunjaya Bhupati, on pilgrimage spots and adopts the child. Meanwhile, Ananda Bhupathi marries King Mahendra Varma's (Dhulipala) sister without his wish for which Mahendra Varma keeps a grudge against him. Thereafter, Ananda Bhupathi is blessed with another child Vijay, he sends him to Gurukul where Dhanunjaya Bhupathi's foster son Simhanadha is a co-student. Years roll by, and both the brothers  Vijay (N. T. Rama Rao) & Simhanadha (Satyanarayana) grow together and qualify in all fields. But Simhanadha is always envious of Vijay's success. So, with a huge penance, Simhananda acquires a magical braid of Jatapala through which he becomes a wizard. Once Kanchana (Devika), daughter of Mahendra Varma, is on her joy trip in the forest when Simhananda tries to molest her, Vijay saves her and learns she is his cousin. At the same time, Mahendra Varma announces the marriage of his daughter when   Vijay gives an assurance that he reunites both families by marrying Kanchana. Vijay reaches Swayamvara where Mahendra Varma keeps a test for the bridegrooms, crooked Simhananda uses his witchcraft intelligence which Mahendra Varma opposes. Vijay wins it, but after knowing his reality, Mahendra Varma insults him when Vijay takes up Kanchana and leaves for his capital. Furious, Mahendra Varma calls Simhanandha and requests him to bring back his daughter along with Ananda Bhupathi. Simhananda uses his black magic, transforms Kanchana into a parrot, holds her in a fort in the middle, and prisons Ananda Bhupathi at the hilltop. Unfortunately, one day, a monkey steals the braid of Jatapala, Simhanadha moves in search of it where he is attacked by man-eaters and Vijay rescues him. Simhanadha cleverly escapes, and tries to molest Kanchana, Vijay arrives and combat begins between both. Then, Vijay's friend Madana (Balakrishna) brings the braid, and Simhnadha snatches it and throws Vijay into the interior of the hill. Now Simhanadha flies to kill Ananda Bhupathi when his shadow falls on a stone by which Yashodara gets back her original form and claims he is harassing his father. But Simhanadha is not ready to accept it. At that moment, Vijay lands realize Simhanadha is his brother and warn him to leave their parents. Ultimately, Vijay takes the help of Srichakra Upasana removes all evil forces from his Simhananda, and makes him a purified person.

Cast
N. T. Rama Rao as Vijay
Devika as Kanchana
Satyanarayana as Simhananda
V. Nagayya
Mikkilineni as Ananda Bhupathi
Dhulipala as Mahendra Varma 
Mukkamala as Govardhan Marharshi 
Ramana Reddy  
Balakrishna as Madana
Chaya Devi as Tankai Venkayamma
Jyothi Lakshmi as Kamini
Meena Kumari as Madhavi 
Pushpa Kumari

Soundtrack

Music composed by Vijaya Krishna Murthy. The song Nelavanka Thongi Choosindhi is a blockbuster hit. Music released by SAREGAMA Audio Company.

References

Indian historical fantasy films
1970s historical fantasy films